The 2000 Crystal Skate of Romania was the 2nd edition of an annual senior-level international figure skating competition held in Romania. It was held between December 15 and 17, 2000 in Bucharest. Skaters competed in the disciplines of men's singles and ladies' singles.

Results

Men

Ladies

External links
 results

2000 in figure skating